The Trocadero, 17 Temple Street, Birmingham, England, currently a pub, is a dazzling demonstration of the use of coloured glazed tile and terracotta in the post-Victorian era of architecture.

Formerly the Fire Engine House for the Norwich Union Insurance Company (1846, Edge & Avery), it was altered in 1883 to make the Bodega wine bar. It was given the current colourful glazed front in 1902 when it became the Trocadero. It is Grade II listed.

The pub is noted as a meeting place for the Birmingham Surrealists group of artists and intellectuals associated with the city from the 1930s to the 1950s.

References

Sources

Pevsner Architectural Guides - Birmingham, Andy Foster, 2005, 

Grade II listed buildings in Birmingham